Beit Nehemia (lit. House of Nehemiah) is a moshav in central Israel. Located near Shoham, it falls under the jurisdiction of Hevel Modi'in Regional Council.

History
During the 18th and 19th centuries, Beit Nehemia was the site of the Arab village of Beit Nabala. It belonged to the Nahiyeh (sub-district) of Lod that encompassed the area of the present-day city of Modi'in-Maccabim-Re'ut in the south to the present-day city of El'ad in the north, and from the foothills in the east, through the Lod Valley to the outskirts of Jaffa in the west. This area was home to thousands of inhabitants in about 20 villages, who had at their disposal tens of thousands of hectares of prime agricultural land.

The village was established in 1950 on the land of the  depopulated Palestinian  village of Beit Nabala by Jewish immigrants from Persia. It was named after the Biblical prophet Nehemiah, who left Persia for Israel like the modern founders.

References

External links

Moshavim
Populated places established in 1950
Populated places in Central District (Israel)
1950 establishments in Israel